Gastón Gaudio was the defending champion but lost in the quarterfinals to Richard Gasquet.

Richard Gasquet won in the final 7–6(7–4), 6–7(3–7), 6–3, 6–3 against Feliciano López.

Seeds
A champion seed is indicated in bold while text in italics indicates the round in which that seed was eliminated.

Draw

 NB: The Final was the best of 5 sets while all other rounds were the best of 3 sets.

Finals

Section 1

Section 2

References
 Draw
 Qualifying draw

Swiss Open (tennis)
2006 ATP Tour
2006 Allianz Suisse Open Gstaad